Elephant Boy is a 1937 British adventure film starring Sabu in his film debut. Documentary filmmaker Robert J. Flaherty, who produced some of the Indian footage, and supervising director Zoltan Korda, who completed the film, won the Best Director Award at the Venice Film Festival. The film was made at the London Films studios at Denham, and in Mysore, India, and is based on the story "Toomai of the Elephants" from Rudyard Kipling's The Jungle Book (1894).

Plot
Toomai (Sabu), a young boy growing up in India, longs to become a hunter. In the meantime, he helps his mahout (elephant driver) father with Kala Nag, a large elephant that has been in their family for four generations.

Petersen (Walter Hudd) hires the father and Kala Nag, among others, for a large annual government roundup of wild elephants to be tamed and put to work. Amused by Toomai and learning that he has no one but his father to look after him, Petersen allows the boy to come too.

Strangely, no elephants have been seen in the region in a while, so Petersen has staked his reputation on a guess that they will be found further north. However, six weeks of hunting prove fruitless. He is ready to give up, but his right-hand man, Machua Appa (Allan Jeayes), persuades him to keep hunting for another month. When the other hired natives learn of Toomai's ambition, they mock him, telling him that he will become a hunter only when he sees the elephants dance (a myth).

One night, Toomai's father spots a tiger prowling near the camp and wakes Petersen. When the two go out to shoot the beast, Toomai's father is killed. Kala Nag's grief becomes so intense, he rampages through the camp, only stopping when Toomai calms him down.

Petersen decides to assign cruel Rham Lahl (Bruce Gordon) to Kala Nag, as Toomai is too young for the job. When Rham Lahl beats the elephant, however, Kala Nag injures his tormenter. The mahout insists that Kala Nag be destroyed, as is the law. Petersen manages to get him to change his mind and accept 100 rupees instead by threatening to have him removed from the safety of the camp.

Unaware of this reprieve, Toomai takes Kala Nag and runs away into the jungle. There, they stumble upon the missing wild elephants, and Toomai sees them dancing. He leads Petersen to them. The other natives are awed, and hail him as "Toomai of the Elephants". Machua Appa offers to train the boy to become a hunter, a plan Petersen approves of.

Cast
 Sabu as Toomai
 W. E. Holloway as Father
 Walter Hudd as Petersen
 Allan Jeayes as Machua Appa
 Bruce Gordon as Rham Lahl
 D. J. Williams as Hunter
 Wilfrid Hyde-White as Commissioner
 Iravatha as Kala Nag (uncredited)
 Harry Lane as Bit Part (uncredited)
 Shaheed Udham Singh (uncredited)

Critical reception
In a contemporary review, The New York Times found the film "one of the most likable of the jungle pictures. Having a simple story at its heart, it has had the wisdom and the good taste to tell it simply and without recourse to synthetic sensationalism. Sabu, its 12-year-old hero, never once is chased by a tiger, embraced by a python or dropped into a swirl of crocodiles," and concluded, "Sabu, the Indian boy, is a sunny-faced, manly little youngster, whose naturalness beneath the camera's scrutiny should bring blushes to the faces of the precocious wonder-children of Hollywood. He's a much better actor than the British players Mr. Flaherty tried to disguise behind frizzed beards and Indian names". Other critics were less kind. Writing for The Spectator in 1937, Graham Greene gave the film a poor review, characterizing it as a "faltering and repetitive picture" and noting that the "disappointing diminutive achievement" was caused directly by "enormous advance publicity, [the] director [being] out of touch with the Press for months, [and] rumours". Greene criticized director Flahery as having released a film with "bad cutting, [] dreadful studio work, [and a] pedestrian adaptation [of] Kipling's story", and specified that Flaherty's biggest "positive crime" in the film was its story construction.

More recently, Time Out thought the film "Amiable but dated," and specifically, "Fiction and documentary footage rub shoulders uneasily, but the latter (shot by Flaherty in India) is vividly watchable."

References

Bibliography
 Michael Korda, Charmed Lives: The Fabulous World of the Korda Brothers (1980) 118–20.

External links
 
 
 
 
 Criterion Collection Essay

1937 films
1930s adventure drama films
British adventure drama films
British black-and-white films
The Jungle Book films
Jungle adventure films
Films based on short fiction
Films about elephants
Films set in India
London Films films
Films shot at Denham Film Studios
Films directed by Robert Flaherty
Films directed by Zoltán Korda
Films produced by Alexander Korda
United Artists films
1937 drama films
1930s English-language films
1930s British films